Karen Ehrenreich (born 24 September 1984) is a Danish long-distance runner. In 2020, she competed in the women's half marathon at the 2020 World Athletics Half Marathon Championships held in Gdynia, Poland.

References 

  3:https://copenhagenmarathon.dk/loebsrekorder-smadret-ved-lunt-copenhagen-marathon/

External links 
 

Living people
1984 births
Place of birth missing (living people)
Danish female long-distance runners
20th-century Danish women
21st-century Danish women